The 2019 St. Louis Cardinals season was the 138th for the St. Louis Cardinals of Major League Baseball (MLB), a franchise in St. Louis, Missouri. It was the 128th season for the Cardinals in the National League (NL), and their 14th at Busch Stadium III. On September 22, 2019, the Cardinals defeated the Chicago Cubs 3-2 to clinch their first playoff berth since 2015. On September 29, the Cardinals clinched the National League Central for the first time since 2015, and defeated the Atlanta Braves in the Division Series on October 9. They went on to play the Washington Nationals in the NLCS, but were swept in four games.

Season standings

National League Central

National League playoff standings

Record vs. opponents

Season summary
On Opening Day, versus the Milwaukee Brewers, catcher Yadier Molina extended his team-record for Opening Day starts with 15. However, the Cardinals would lose the game 5-4. The following game, newly-acquired first baseman Paul Goldschmidt homered three times in a 9−5 win over the Brewers, making him the fastest player to hit a three-home run game with a new team.  He also drove in five runs. This would be the only game the Cardinals would win in the 4 game series.

April would start out strong for the Cardinals with them winning 7 out of their 9 first games of the month, including a sweep of the Los Angeles Dodgers. The following series would be more rough, with them splitting a 2 game series against the Cincinnati Reds and going 1-2 in a series against the Milwaukee Brewers (where right fielder Tyler O'Neil and pitcher Mike Mikolas would both be injured) and causing them to lose their first place position and fall to third. After another loss against the New York Mets on April 19, they would go back on a winning streak winning 9 of their last 10 games. However, center fielder Harrison Bader would be injured on April 17 and just 2 days later pitcher Michael Wacha would be injured, but he would be reactivated 10 days later. At the end of the month the Cardinals would have a 19-10 record with a .655 winning percentage, the best in the league.

The first two games of May were finishing up a 4-game series against the Washington Nationals, which the Cardinals took 3 of the 4 games. The Cardinals were 3 games ahead of the second place team the Chicago Cubs (their arch rival) which they would be playing against next. But things would turn southward for the Cardinals as they would be swept by them. This would be followed by a 3-game series against the Philadelphia Phillies, the leader of the NL East division, which they would only win one game out of. Now having fallen back to third, they would have to play a 4-game series against the Pittsburgh Pirates, the 4th place team in their division. Despite a 17-4 win to kick off the series, they would lose the next 3 games and fall to fourth place. For the following 5 series against the Atlanta Braves (twice), Texas Rangers, Kansas City Royals, and Philadelphia Phillies, they would only win 1 game of each and lose the rest leading to a 5-9 record. With a win against the Chicago Cubs to close the month, they would end it 9-18 for a record of 28-28 as they struggled to keep their record above .500. Also on the last day, catcher Yadier Molina was injured and would be out for 10 days.

The first two games of June were against the Chicago Cubs which the Cardinals would sweep. But after splitting a two game series against the Reds, the Cardinals would face the Cubs once again, but this time they were swept. During this series on June 8, rookie shortstop Tommy Edman would be called up from the Memphis Cardinals. The following 2 series against the Miami Marlins and New York Mets seemed to be a return back to normal. Although pitcher Adam Wainwright was injured in the first game against the Marlins, the Cardinals would be able to beat them. They would also win the second game when Yadier Molina returned, but would lose the third 9-0 and be limited to just 2 hits. With this being against the worst team in the NL, it was particularly hard. They would win the series against the New York Mets 3-1 and play against the Marlins again and split the series 2-2 with Tommy Edman hitting his first home in the MLB in the final game on June 20, though they would still lose 7-6. They had been 10-8 so far in the month and had advanced backup to third place and were 3 games out of first with 8 games left in the month. They won their next 2 games against the Los Angeles Dodgers and were now one game out of first. But, they would go on a 5 game losing streak after this and be outscored 30-10 playing one last game against the Dodgers and two against the Oakland Athletics and San Diego Padres. The final game of the season was against the Padres which they would win ending the month 13-13 making their record 41-41, again at .500. During this time left fielder Marcell Ozuna would be injured leading to Tyler O'Neill to be recalled from the minors.

Before the All-Star Game, the Cardinals would go 2-1 against the Seattle Mariners and 1-2 against the San Francisco Giants leading to have a record of 44-44 going into the break. The Cardinals were still in third, but now just two games out of first place. On July 11, a day before the first game back, Yadier Molina would be put back on the DL while 3rd baseman Matt Carpenter would be taken off. Coming back from the break the Cardinals would be red hot through the rest of the month. They would win their first series 2-1 against the Arizona Diamondbacks followed by a 2-1 series against the Pittsburgh Pirates (when they would briefly jump into third). But after this, they would go 8-1 going 3-1 against the Cincinnati Reds and sweeping the Pirate's (along with one win against the Houston Astros). With this they had propelled themselves back into first, but only by one game. After losing the final two matches against the Astros and going 1-1 against the Cubs, they would be tied for first. They went 16-9 in the month making their record 57-50 with two months to go in the season. This all with a strong of injuries causing Matt Carpenter, Marcell Ozuna, and Harrison Bader to be sent down to the minors.

After a win against the Cubs to close out the series, the Cardinals would go on another 5 game losing streak, being swept by the Oakland Athletics and Los Angeles Dodgers and as a result fell back to third. However, the Cardinals would make up for this and go on a 5 game winning streak sweeping the Pittsburgh Pirates and Kansas City Royals. They were helped by the fact that Matt Carpenter, Yadier Molina and Harrison Bader were all added back to the roster. After splitting a 4-game series with the Reds and going 2-1 against the Milwaukee Brewers, The cardinals would go on another 6 game winning streak, sweeping the Colorado Rockies and winning 2 more against the Brewers. After another loss against the Brewers, the Cardinals would win both games of a double-header against the Cincinnati Reds. With an 18-9 record (and only losing 4 games from August 9-31), they now had a 73-58 record and were 3 games in front of the second place team Chicago Cubs.

The Cardinals continued their winning streak, winning a series against the San Francisco Giants 3-1 and Pittsburgh Pirates 2-1, moving themselves to 4 games ahead in first. However, their next two series wouldn't be as good, with them losing 1-2 against the Colorado Rockies and Milwaukee Brewers. Meanwhile, the Cubs went on a 4 game winning streak meaning the Cardinals were now just 2 games ahead in first. The next series against the Washington Nationals the Cardinals would win 2-1 while the Cubs win streak would snap and they would fall back one game. Meanwhile, the Brewers went on their own 4-game winning streak meaning they were now tied with the Chicago Cubs and in running for the Wild Card spot. With 10 games left in the season, the   team the Cardinals would playing against in the series would be the Chicago Cubs. If the Cardinals swept the Cubs, then they would clinch into the playoffs. If the Cubs swept the Cardinals, they would be pushed back to second.

In the first game, the Cardinals took a 4-1 lead in the 6th inning. after two scoreless inning, pitcher Carlos Martinez was brought in to close the match in the bottom of the 9th. He would give up 1 walk and 3 hits allowing the Cubs to come back to 4-3 with one out and a man on third. A pitching change would allow Andrew Miller to come in and get the final two outs, but still allow the tying run to come in making it 4-4 with extra innings. In the 10th inning, Matt Carpenter would hit a home run and make it 5-4 Cardinals bringing them back to the same situation. Pitcher Giovanny Gallegos would be brought in to close the game. He would get 3 consecutive outs leading to a Cardinal victory. The Brewers would also win pushing the Cubs down to third. In the second game, the Cubs would take the early 1-0 lead in the second inning. In the 6th inning with the bases loaded by walks, Yadier Molina would come up and hit a single leading to Marcell Ozuna and Matt Carpenter to score making it 2-1 Cardinals. After 3 scoreless innings, the Cardinals would win.

The third game would be more indecisive. After a groundout by Paul Goldschmidt allowed Tommy Edman to score, Cardinals pitcher Dakota Hudson would give up a single and four walks. After a sacrifice fly, the Cubs would be up 3-1. The game would swing back and forth with by the 4th inning the Cardinals being up 5-3 before a two-run homer by Ian Happ would make it 5-5. By the 7th inning the Cardinals retook the lead 7-6 with a two-run homer off of Marcell Ozuna, but the Cubs would retake it in the bottom of the same inning making it 8-7. With no runs in the 8th inning, Craig Kimbrel would come up to pitch for the Cubs. Yadier Molina was the first hitter and the first pitch thrown to him was hammered to left-center tying the game 8-8. Paul DeJong was up next, and the first pitch thrown at him (the second of the inning) was hit also to left-center putting the Cardinals on top 9-8. Following a scoreless bottom of the 9th, the Cardinals would win and be one game away from clinching into the playoffs. The Cubs once again took the lead in the 6th inning at 2-1, but in the 9th inning they once again came back and won it 3-2, clinching the playoff spot. It was the first time the Cardinals swept the Cubs in a 4-game series at Wrigley since the 1930's.

After another win against the Arizona Diamondbacks, the Cardinals would close out a 6 game winning streak and end up losing the next two games of the series. Meanwhile, the Milwaukee Brewers were on a 6 game winning streak and had clinched a playoff berth. Going into the final 3-game series of the season against the Chicago Cubs again, the Brewers were one game behind first place. The Cardinals would lose the first game, but the Brewers would as well. The second game the Cardinals would lose as well extending their losing streak to 4, but the Brewers also lost theirs. In the final game of the season, the Cardinals would beat the Cubs 9-0 with Jack Flaherty pitching 7 innings and only allowing 2 hits. The Brewers would lose their game, but it didn't matter as the Cardinals clinched the division and would go to the postseason. They ended the month 15-12 for a final record of 91-71, which was the lowest amount of wins out of any first place team.

Game log

Regular season

Legend:       = Win       = Loss       = PostponementBold = Cardinals player

|- style="background:#fbb;"         
| 1 || March 28 || @Brewers || 4–5 || Chacín (1–0) || Mikolas (0–1) || Hader (1) || 45,304 || 0–1 || L1
|- style="background:#cfc;"
| 2 || March 29 || @Brewers || 9–5 || Gant (1–0) || Williams (0–1) || || 30,157 || 1–1 || W1
|- style="background:#fbb;"
| 3 || March 30 || @Brewers || 2–4 || Woodruff (1–0) || Hudson (0–1) || Hader (2) || 36,655 || 1–2 || L1
|- style="background:#fbb;"
| 4 || March 31 || @Brewers || 4–5 || Barnes (1–0) || Hicks (0–1) || || 35,042 || 1–3 || L2
|-

|- style="background:#cfc;"
| 5 || April 1 || @Pirates || 6–5 (12) || Hicks (1–1) || Brault (0–1) ||  Gant (1) || 37,336 || 2–3 || W1
|- style="background:#cfc;"
| 6 || April 3 || @Pirates || 5–4 (10) || Gant (2–0) || Burdi (0–1) || Hudson (1) || 23,954 || 3–3 || W2
|- style="background:#bbb;"
| – || April 4 || Padres || colspan="7" | Postponed (inclement weather) (Makeup date: April 5th)
|- style="background:#fbb;"
| 7 || April 5 || Padres || 3–5 || Stock (1–0) || Reyes (0–1) || Yates (4) || 46,615 || 3–4 || L1
|- style="background:#fbb;"
| 8 || April 6 || Padres || 4–6 || Wisler (1–0) || Miller (0–1) || Yates (5) || 44,492 || 3–5 || L2
|- style="background:#cfc;"
| 9 || April 7 || Padres || 4–1 || Wainwright (1–0) || Strahm (0–2) || Hicks (1) || 44,340 || 4–5 || W1
|- style="background:#cfc;"
| 10 || April 8 || Dodgers || 4–3 || Mikolas (1–1) || Kelly (1–2) || Hicks (2) || 35,858 || 5–5 || W2
|- style="background:#cfc;"
| 11 || April 9 || Dodgers || 4–0 || Brebbia (1–0) || Stripling (0–1) || || 36,353 || 6–5 || W3
|- style="background:#cfc;"
| 12 || April 10 || Dodgers || 7–2 || Flaherty (1–0) || Maeda (2–1) || || 36,244 || 7–5 || W4
|- style="background:#cfc;"
| 13 || April 11 || Dodgers || 11–7 || Gallegos (1–0) || Báez (0–1) || || 38,200 || 8–5 || W5
|- style="background:#fbb;"
| 14 || April 13 || @Reds* || 2–5 || Hughes (1–0) || Wainwright (1–1) || Iglesias (2) || 16,496 || 8–6 || L1
|- style="background:#cfc;"
| 15 || April 14 || @Reds* || 9–5 || Gant (3–0) || Garrett (1–1) || Hicks (3) || 16,793 || 9–6 || W1
|- style="background:#fbb;"
| 16 || April 15 || @Brewers || 7–10 || Guerra (1–0) || Mayers (0–1) || || 28,199 || 9–7 || L1
|- style="background:#fbb;"
| 17 || April 16 || @Brewers || 4–8 || Woodruff (2–1) || Flaherty (1–1) || || 30,260 || 9–8 || L2
|- style="background:#cfc;"
| 18 || April 17 || @Brewers || 6–3 || Wacha (1–0) || Burnes (0–2) || Hicks (4) || 29,817 || 10–8 || W1
|- style="background:#fbb;"
| 19 || April 19 || Mets || 5–4 ||Lugo (1–0)||Wainwright (1–2)
|Díaz (7)
| 40,413 || 10–9 ||L1
|- style="background:#cfc;"
| 20 || April 20 || Mets || 10–2 ||Mikolas (2–1)
|Flexen (0–1)
|  || 47,059 || 11–9 ||W1
|- style="background:#cfc;"
| 21 || April 21 || Mets || 6–4 ||Hudson (1-1)
|Syndergaard (1–2)
|Hicks (5)
| 42,765 || 12–9 ||W2
|- style="background:#cfc;"
| 22 || April 22 || Brewers || 13–5 ||Flaherty (2–1)
|Houser (0–1)
|  || 35,819 || 13–9 ||W3
|- style="background:#cfc;"
| 23 || April 23 || Brewers || 4–3 ||Miller (1–1)
|Wilson (1–1)
|Hicks (6)
| 38,474 || 14–9 ||W4
|- style="background:#cfc;"
| 24 || April 24 || Brewers || 5–2 ||Wainwright (2–2)
|Chacín (2–3)
|Hicks (7)
| 36,878 || 15–9 ||W5
|- style="background:#fbb;"
| 25 || April 26 || Reds || 1–12 || DeSclafani (1–1) || Mikolas (2–2) || || 45,087  || 15–10 ||L1
|- style="background:#cfc;"
| 26 || April 27 || Reds || 6–3 || Hudson (2–1) || Mahle (0–3) || Hicks (8) || 44,197 || 16–10 ||W1
|- style="background:#cfc;"
| 27 || April 28 || Reds || 5–2 || Flaherty (3–1) || Gray (0–4) || Gant (2) || 45,701 || 17–10 ||W2
|- style="background:#cfc;"
| 28 || April 29 || @Nationals || 6–3 || Wacha (2–0) || Corbin (2–1) || Hicks (9) || 17,890 || 18–10 || W3
|- style="background:#cfc;"
| 29 || April 30 || @Nationals || 3–2 || Wainwright (3–2) || Sánchez (0–4)|| Miller (1) || 19,753 || 19–10 || W4
|-
|colspan="10"|*April 13 and 14 games played in Monterrey, Mexico
|-

|- style="background:#cfc;"
| 30 || May 1 || @Nationals || 5–1 || Mikolas (3–2) || Scherzer (1–4) || — || 22,157 || 20–10 || W5
|- style="background:#fbb;"
| 31 || May 2 || @Nationals || 1–2 || Strasburg (3–1) || Hudson (2–2) || Doolittle (4) || 24,338 || 20–11 || L1
|- style="background:#fbb;"
| 32 || May 3 || @Cubs || 0–4 || Hendricks (2–4) || Flaherty (3–2) || —   || 34,978 || 20–12 || L2
|- style="background:#fbb;"
| 33 || May 4 || @Cubs || 5–6 || Kintzler (1– 0) || Brebbia (1–1) || Strop (4) || 39,601 || 20–13 || L3
|- style="background:#fbb;"
| 34 || May 5 || @Cubs || 5–13 || Quintana (4–1) || Wainwright (3–3) || || 36,499 || 20–14 || L4
|- style="background:#cfc;"
| 35 || May 6 || Phillies || 6–0 || Mikolas (4–2) || Velasquez (1–2) || || 38,419 || 21–14 || W1
|- style="background:#fbb;"
| 36 || May 7 || Phillies || 1–11 || Nola (3–0) || Hudson (2– 3) || || 38,562 || 21–15 || L1
|- style="background:#fbb;"
| 37 || May 8 || Phillies || 0–5 || Eickhoff (2–1) || Flaherty (3–3) || || 42,309 || 21–16 || L2
|- style="background:#cfc;"
| 38 || May 9 || Pirates || 17–4 || Wacha (3–0) || Musgrove (1–4) || || 38,925 || 22–16 || W1
|- style="background:#fbb;"
| 39 || May 10 || Pirates || 1–2 || Williams (2–1) || Miller (1–2) || Vázquez (11) || 45,060 || 22–17 || L1
|- style="background:#fbb;"
| 40 || May 11 || Pirates || 1–2 || Lyles (3–1) || Mikolas (4–3) || Vázquez (12) || 43,011 || 22–18 || L2
|- style="background:#fbb;"
| 41 || May 12 || Pirates || 6–10 || Stratton (1–2) || Brebbia (1–2) || || 48,555 || 22–19 || L3
|- style="background:#cfc;"
| 42 || May 14 || @Braves || 14–3 || Flaherty (4–3) || Foltynewicz (0–3) || || 23,718 || 23–19 || W1
|- style="background:#fbb;"
| 43 || May 15 || @Braves || 0–4 || Soroka (4–1) || Wacha (3– 1) || Jackson (5) || 23,367 || 23–20 || L1
|- style="background:#fbb;"
| 44 || May 16 || @Braves || 2–10 || Teherán (3–4) || Wainwright (3–4) || || 28,783 || 23–21 || L2
|- style="background:#fbb;"
| 45 || May 17 || @Rangers || 3–7 || Sampson (1–3) || Mikolas (4–4) || || 34,398 || 23–22 || L3
|- style="background:#cfc;"
| 46 || May 18 || @Rangers || 8–2 || Hudson (3– 3) || Jurado (1– 2) || || 30,967 || 24–22 || W1
|- style="background:#fbb;"
| 47 || May 19 || @Rangers || 4–5 (10) || Gómez (1–0) || Hicks (1–2) || || 32,112 || 24–23 || L1
|- style="background:#bbb;"
| – || May 21 || Royals || colspan=8;|Postponed (rain) Makeup: May 22
|- style="background:#fbb;"
| 48 || May 22 || Royals || 2–8 || Keller (3–5) || Wacha (3– 2) || || 42,725 || 24–24 || L2
|- style="background:#cfc;"
| 49 || May 22 || Royals || 10–3 || Wainwright (4–4) || Bailey (4–5) || || 42,529 || 25–24 || W1
|- style="background:#fbb;"
| 50 || May 24 || Braves || 2–5 || Foltynewicz (1–3) || Mikolas (4–5) || || 44,630 || 25–25 || L1
|- style="background:#cfc;"
| 51 || May 25 || Braves || 6–3 || Miller (2–2) || Winkler (1–1) || Hicks (10) || 45,760 || 26–25 || W1
|- style="background:#fbb;"
| 52 || May 26 || Braves || 3–4 || Webb (3–0) || Webb (0–1) || Jackson (7) || 45,152 || 26–26 || L1
|- style="background:#fbb;"
| 53 || May 28 || @Phillies || 3–4 || Pivetta (3–1) || Wainwright (4–5) || Neris (10) || 29,084 || 26–27 || L2
|- style="background:#fbb;"
| 54 || May 29 || @Phillies || 4–11 || Nola (6–0) || Cabrera (0–1) || || 30,486 || 26–28 || L3
|- style="background:#cfc;"
| 55 || May 30 || @Phillies || 5–3 || Hudson (4–3) || Eickhoff (2–3) || Hicks (11) || 31,206 || 27–28 || W1
|- style="background:#cfc;"
| 56 || May 31 || Cubs || 2–1 (10) || Hicks (2–2) || Montgomery (1–1) || || 45,321 || 28–28 || W2
|-

|- style="background:#cfc;"
| 57 || June 1 || Cubs || 7–4 || Gant (4–0) || Chatwood (3–1) || Martínez (1) || 46,297 || 29–28 || W3
|- style="background:#cfc;"
| 58 || June 2 || Cubs || 2–1 || Wainwright (5–5) || Hamels (4–2) || Gant (3) || 46,053 || 30–28 || W4
|- style="background:#fbb;"
| 59 || June 4 || Reds || 1–4 || Castillo (6–1) || Cabrera (0–2) || Iglesias (12) || 40,649 || 30–29 || L1
|- style="background:#bbb;"
| – || June 5 || Reds || colspan=8;|Postponed (rain) Makeup: August 31
|- style="background:#cfc;"
| 60 || June 6 || Reds || 3–1 || Gant (5–0) || Lorenzen (0–1) || Hicks (12) || 44,654 || 31–29 || W1
|- style="background:#fbb;"
| 61 || June 7 || @Cubs || 1–3 || Hamels (5–2) || Mikolas (4–6) || Strop (6) || 40,671 || 31–30 || L1
|- style="background:#fbb;"
| 62 || June 8 || @Cubs || 4–9 || Lester (5–4) || Brebbia (1–3) || — || 41,005 || 31–31 || L2
|- style="background:#fbb;"
| 63 || June 9 || @Cubs || 1–5 || Hendricks (7–4) || Wainwright (5–6) || Strop (7) || 39,545 || 31–32 || L3
|- style="background:#cfc;"
| 64 || June 10 || @Marlins || 4–1 || Wacha (4–2) || Alcántara (3–6) || Hicks (13) || 6,585 || 32–32 || W1
|- style="background:#cfc;"
| 65 || June 11 || @Marlins || 7–1 || Hudson (5–3) || Hernández (0–1) || — || 6,308 || 33–32 || W2
|- style="background:#fbb;"
| 66 || June 12 || @Marlins || 0–9 || Yamamoto (1–0) || Mikolas (4–7) || — || 7,001 || 33–33 || L1
|- style="background:#bbb;"
| – || June 13 || @Mets || colspan=8;|Suspended (rain) Continuation: June 14
|- style="background:#cfc;"
| 67 || June 14 || @Mets || 5–4 (10) || Martínez (1–0) || Díaz (1–4) || Hicks (14) || 31,862 || 34–33 || W1
|- style="background:#cfc;"
| 68 || June 14 || @Mets || 9–5 || Gant (6–0) || Familia (2–1) || — || 28,560 || 35–33 || W2
|- style="background:#fbb;"
| 69 || June 15 || @Mets || 7–8 || Syndergaard (5–4) || Wacha (4–3) || Díaz (15) || 32,589 || 35–34 || L1
|- style="background:#cfc;"
| 70 || June 16 || @Mets || 4–3 || Miller (3–2) || Flexen (0–3) || Martínez (2) || 37,054 || 36–34 || W1
|- style="background:#cfc;"
| 71 || June 17 || Marlins || 5–0 || Mikolas (5–7) || Hernández (0–2) || — || 41,274 || 37–34 || W2
|- style="background:#fbb;"
| 72 || June 18 || Marlins || 0–6 || Yamamoto (2–0) || Flaherty (4–4) || — || 41,467 || 37–35 || L1
|- style="background:#cfc;"
| 73 || June 19 || Marlins || 2–1 (11) || Gant (7–0) || Conley (1–7) || — || 40,126 || 38–35 || W1
|- style="background:#fbb;"
| 74 || June 20 || Marlins || 6–7 (11) || García (1–0) || Miller (3–3) || Romo (13) || 42,446 || 38–36 || L1
|- style="background:#cfc;"
| 75 || June 21 || Angels || 5–1 || Wacha (5–3) || Canning (2–4) || — || 48,423 || 39–36 || W1
|- style="background:#cfc;"
| 76 || June 22 || Angels || 4–2 || Hudson (6–3) || Peña (5–2) || Webb (1) || 46,711 || 40–36 || W2
|- style="background:#fbb;"
| 77 || June 23 || Angels || 4–6 || Skaggs (7–6) || Mikolas (5–8) || — || 47,114 || 40–37 || L1
|- style="background:#fbb;"
| 78 || June 25 || Athletics || 3–7 || Wendelken (1–1) || Flaherty (4–5) || — || 40,556 || 40–38 || L2
|- style="background:#fbb;"
| 79 || June 26 || Athletics || 0–2 || Mengden (2–1) || Wainwright (5–7) ||  Hendriks (2) || 44,871 || 40–39 || L3
|- style="background:#fbb;"
| 80 || June 28 || @Padres || 1–3 || Quantrill (2–2) || Wacha (5–4) || Yates (27) || 33,329 || 40–40 || L4
|- style="background:#fbb;"
| 81 || June 29 || @Padres || 2–12 || Paddack (5–4) || Hudson (6–4) || — || 44,407 || 40–41 || L5
|- style="background:#cfc;"
| 82 || June 30 || @Padres || 5–3 || Martínez (2–0) || Wieck (0–1) || Leone (1) || 32,375 || 41–41 || W1
|-

|- style="background:#fbb;"
| 83 || July 2 || @Mariners || 4–5 || Adams (1–0) || Gallegos (1–1) || Elías (11) || 20,173 || 41–42 || L1
|- style="background:#cfc;"
| 84 || July 3 || @Mariners || 5–2 || Brebbia (2–3) || Adams (1–1) || || 31,878 || 42–42 || W1
|- style="background:#cfc;"
| 85 || July 4 || @Mariners || 5–4 || Ponce de Leon (1–0) || Milone (1–3) || Martínez (3) || 26,656 || 43–42 || W2
|- style="background:#cfc;"
| 86 || July 5 || @Giants || 9–4 || Hudson (7–4) || Pomeranz (2–9) || — ||  37,603 || 44–42 || W3
|- style="background:#fbb;"
| 87 || July 6 || @Giants || 4–8 || Dyson (3–1) || Mikolas (5–9) || — || 32,487 || 44–43 || L1
|- style="background:#fbb;"
| 88 || July 7 || @Giants || 0–1 || Samardzija (6–7) || Flaherty (4–6) || Smith (23) || 33,481 || 44–44 || L2
|- style=background:#bbbfff 
|colspan=10|90th All-Star Game in Cleveland, OH
|- style="background:#fbb;"
| 89 || July 12 || Diamondbacks || 2–4 || Ray (7–6) || Miller (3–4) || Holland (15) || 44,960 || 44–45 || L3
|- style="background:#cfc;"
| 90 || July 13 || Diamondbacks || 4–2 || Hudson (8–4) || Kelly (7–9) || Martínez (4) || 46,152 || 45–45 || W1
|- style="background:#cfc;"
| 91 || July 14 || Diamondbacks || 5–2 || Wainwright (6–7) || Greinke (10–4) || Martínez (5) || 43,439 || 46–45 || W2
|- style="background:#cfc;"
| 92 || July 15 || Pirates || 7–0 || Mikolas (6–9) || Musgrove (6–8) || — || 41,965 || 47–45 || W3
|- style="background:#fbb;"
| 93 || July 16 || Pirates || 1–3 || Liriano (4–1) || Martínez (2–1) || Vázquez (21) || 43,777 || 47–46 || L1
|- style="background:#cfc;"
| 94 || July 17 || Pirates || 6–5 || Brebbia (3–3)|| Liriano (4–2) || Martínez (6) || 43,186 || 48–46 || W1 
|- style="background:#cfc;"
| 95 || July 18 || @Reds || 7–4 || Hudson (9–4) || Stephenson (2–2) || Miller (2) || 32,359 || 49–46 || W2
|- style="background:#cfc;"
| 96 || July 19 || @Reds || 12–11 || Wacha (6–4) || Hughes (3–3) || Martínez (7) || 37,652 || 50–46 || W3
|- style="background:#fbb;"
| 97 || July 20 || @Reds || 2–3 || Garrett (4–1) || Mikolas (6–10) || Lorenzen (6) || 38,427 || 50–47 || L1
|- style="background:#cfc;"
| 98 || July 21 || @Reds || 3–1 || Gallegos (2–1) || DeSclafani (5–5) || Martínez (8) || 28,763 || 51–47 || W1
|- style="background:#cfc;"
| 99 || July 22 || @Pirates || 6–5  || Shreve (1–0) || Holmes (1–1) || Martínez (9) || 13,096 || 52–47 || W2
|- style="background:#cfc;"
| 100 || July 23 || @Pirates || 4–3 || Hudson (10–4) || Archer (3–7) || Miller (3) || 15,778 || 53–47 || W3
|- style="background:#cfc;"
| 101 || July 24 || @Pirates || 14–8 || Wainwright (7–7) || Lyles (5–7) || — || 18,675 || 54–47 || W4
|- style="background:#cfc;"
| 102 || July 25 || @Pirates || 6–3 || Mikolas (7–10) || Musgrove (7–9) || — || 24,534 || 55–47 || W5
|- style="background:#cfc;"
| 103 || July 26 || Astros || 5–3 || Miller (4–4) || Pressly (2–2) || Martínez (10) || 44,724 || 56–47 || W6
|- style="background:#fbb;"
| 104 || July 27 || Astros || 2–8 || Cole (12–5) || Ponce de Leon (1–1) || —|| 46,518 || 56–48 || L1
|- style="background:#fbb;"
| 105 || July 28 || Astros || 2–6 || Miley (9–4) || Hudson (10–5) || — || 46,714 || 56–49 || L2
|- style="background:#cfc;"
| 106 || July 30 || Cubs || 2–1 || Gallegos (3–1) || Darvish (3–5) || Martínez (11) || 46,123 || 57–49 || W1
|- style="background:#fbb;"
| 107 || July 31 || Cubs || 0–2 || Hendricks (8–8) || Mikolas (7–11) || Kimbrel (8) || 43,750 || 57–50 || L1
|-

|- style="background:#cfc;"
| 108 || August 1 || Cubs || 8–0 || Flaherty (5–6) || Lester (9–7) || — || 46,811 || 58–50 || W1
|- style="background:#fbb;"
| 109 || August 3 || @Athletics || 3–8 || Fiers (10–3) || Hudson (10–6) || — || 24,851 || 58–51 || L1
|- style="background:#fbb;"
| 110 || August 4 || @Athletics || 2–4 || Roark (7–7) || Wainwright (7–8) || Hendriks (11) || 24,603 || 58–52 || L2
|- style="background:#fbb;"
| 111 || August 5 || @Dodgers || 0–8 || Gonsolin (1–1) || Wacha (6–5) || — || 45,254 || 58–53 || L3
|- style="background:#fbb;"
| 112 || August 6 || @Dodgers || 1–3 || Kershaw (11–2) || Mikolas (7–12) || Jansen (26) || 53,070 || 58–54 || L4
|- style="background:#fbb;"
| 113 || August 7 || @Dodgers || 1–2 || Sadler (2–0) || Martínez (2–2) || — || 48,994 || 58–55 || L5
|- style="background:#cfc;"
| 114 || August 9 || Pirates || 6–2 || Martínez (3–2) || Rodríguez (3–5) || — || 42,757 || 59–55 || W1
|- style="background:#cfc;"
| 115 || August 10 || Pirates || 3–1 || Wainwright (8–8) || Musgrove (8–11) || Martínez (12) || 45,026 || 60–55 || W2
|- style="background:#cfc;"
| 116 || August 11 || Pirates || 11–9 || Gant (8–0) || Crick (3–7) || Miller (4) || 43,912 || 61–55 || W3
|- style="background:#cfc;"
| 117 || August 13 || @Royals || 2–0 || Flaherty (6–6) || Sparkman (3–8) || Martínez (13) || 23,563 || 62–55 || W4
|- style="background:#cfc;"
| 118 || August 14 || @Royals || 6–0 || Hudson (11–6) || Keller (7–13) || — || 22,494 || 63–55 || W5
|- style="background:#fbb;"
| 119 || August 15 || @Reds || 1–2 || Gray (8–6) || Wacha (6–6) || Iglesias (24) || 14,891 || 63–56 || L1
|- style="background:#cfc;"
| 120 || August 16 || @Reds || 13–4 || Wainwright (9–8) || Castillo (11–5) || — || 24,118 || 64–56 || W1
|- style="background:#fbb;"
| 121 || August 17 || @Reds || 1–6 || DeSclafani (8–7) || Mikolas (7–13) || — || 37,698 || 64–57 || L1
|- style="background:#cfc;"
| 122 || August 18 || @Reds || 5–4 || Flaherty (7–6) || Wood (1–2) || Martínez (14) || 21,525 || 65–57 || W1
|- style="background:#cfc;"
| 123 || August 19 || Brewers || 3–0 || Hudson (12–6) || Davies (8–6) || Miller (5) || 44,843 || 66–57 || W2
|- style="background:#cfc;"
| 124 || August 20 || Brewers || 9–4 || Webb (1–1) || Jeffress (3-4) || — || 37,823 || 67-57 || W3
|- style="background:#fbb;"
| 125 || August 21 || Brewers || 3–5  || Houser (6–5) || Wainwright (9–9) || Guerra (3) || 40,250 || 67–58 || L1
|- style="background:#cfc;"
| 126 || August 22 || Rockies || 6–5 || Leone (1–0) || Almonte (0–1) || Martínez (15) || 36,465 || 68–58 || W1
|- style="background:#cfc;"
| 127 || August 23 || Rockies || 8–3 || Flaherty (8–6) || Lambert (2–4) || — || 40,829 || 69–58 || W2
|- style="background:#cfc;"
| 128 || August 24 || Rockies || 6–0 || Hudson (13–6) || Gonzalez (0–5) || — || 42,102 || 70–58 || W3
|- style="background:#cfc;"
| 129 || August 25 || Rockies || 11–4 || Helsley (1–0) || Senzatela (8–8) || — || 45,551 || 71–58 || W4
|- style="background:#cfc;"
| 130 || August 26 || @Brewers || 12–2 || Gant (9–0) || González (2–2) || — || 29,475 || 72–58 || W5
|- style="background:#cfc;"
| 131 || August 27 || @Brewers || 6–3 || Mikolas (8–13) || Albers (5–4) || Martínez (16) || 36,690 || 73–58 || W6
|- style="background:#fbb;"
| 132 || August 28 || @Brewers || 1–4 || Lyles (9–8) || Flaherty (8–7) || Hader (26) || 33,045 || 73–59 || L1
|- style="background:#bbb;"
| — || August 30 || Reds || colspan=8;|Postponed (rain) Makeup: September 1
|- style="background:#cfc;"
| 133 || August 31 || Reds || 10–6 || Hudson (14–6) || Bauer (10–12) || — || 44,738 || 74–59 || W1
|- style="background:#cfc;"
| 134 || August 31 || Reds || 3–2 || Gant (10–0) || Iglesias (2–11) || — || 42,074 || 75–59 || W2
|-

|- style="background:#cfc;"
| 135 || September 1 || Reds || 4–3 || Martínez (4–2) || Lorenzen (0–4) || — || 43,692 || 76–59 || W3
|- style="background:#fbb;"
| 136 || September 1 || Reds || 3–5 || Castillo (14–5) || Ponce de Leon (1–2) || Iglesias (28) || 38,665 || 76–60 || L1
|- style="background:#cfc;"
| 137 || September 2 || Giants || 3–1 || Wainwright (10–9) || Beede (3–9) || Martínez (17) || 40,732 || 77–60 || W1
|- style="background:#cfc;"
| 138 || September 3 || Giants || 1–0 || Flaherty (9–7) || Rodríguez (5–8) || Martínez (18) || 38,259 || 78–60 || W2
|- style="background:#fbb;"
| 139 || September 4 || Giants || 8–9 || Rogers (1–0) || Gallegos (3–2) || Smith (31) || 41,945 || 78–61 || L1
|- style="background:#cfc;"
| 140 || September 5 || Giants || 10–0 || Hudson (15–6) || Webb (1–1) || Cabrera (1) || 36,800 || 79–61 || W1
|- style="background:#fbb;"
| 141 || September 6 || @Pirates || 4–9 || Wang (3–0) || Miller (4–5) || Vázquez (25) || 19,090 || 79–62 || L1
|- style="background:#cfc;"
| 142 || September 7 || @Pirates || 10–1 || Wainwright (11–9) || Brault (4–4) || — || 23,996 || 80–62 || W1
|- style="background:#cfc;"
| 143 || September 8 || @Pirates || 2–0 || Flaherty (10–7) || Marvel (0–1) || Martínez (19) || 18,363 || 81–62 || W2 
|- style="background:#fbb;"
| 144 || September 10 || @Rockies || 1–2 || Gonzalez (1–6) || Wacha (6–7) || Díaz (2) || 31,514 || 81–63 || L1
|- style="background:#fbb;"
| 145 || September 11 || @Rockies || 1–2 || Senzatela (9–10) || Hudson (15–7) || Díaz (3) || 31,931 || 81–64 || L2
|- style="background:#cfc;"
| 146 || September 12 || @Rockies || 10–3 || Mikolas (9–13) || Melville (2–2) || — || 27,618 || 82–64 || W1
|- style="background:#cfc;"
| 147 || September 13 || Brewers || 10–0 || Wainwright (12–9) || Houser (6–6) || — || 47,075 || 83–64 || W2
|- style="background:#fbb;"
| 148 || September 14 || Brewers || 2–5 || Lyles (11–8) || Flaherty (10–8) || Hader (32) || 46,665 || 83–65 || L1
|- style="background:#fbb;"
| 149 || September 15 || Brewers || 6–7 || Albers (7–5) || Gant (10–1) || Hader (33) || 46,722 || 83–66 || L2
|- style="background:#cfc;"
| 150 || September 16 || Nationals || 4–2 || Hudson (16–7) || Doolittle (6–5) || Martínez (20) || 42,812 || 84–66 || W1
|- style="background:#fbb;"
| 151 || September 17 || Nationals || 2–6 || Corbin (13–7) || Mikolas (9–14) || Hudson (4) || 44,061 || 84–67 || L1
|- style="background:#cfc;"
| 152 || September 18 || Nationals || 5–1 || Wainwright (13–9) || Scherzer (10–7) || Martínez (21) || 37,669 || 85–67 || W1
|- style="background:#cfc;"
| 153 || September 19 || @Cubs || 5–4 (10) || Miller (5–5) || Kimbrel (0–3) || Gallegos (1) || 39,524 || 86–67 || W2
|- style="background:#cfc;"
| 154 || September 20 || @Cubs || 2–1 || Helsley (2–0) || Phelps (2–1) || Martínez (22) || 39,106 || 87–67 || W3
|- style="background:#cfc;"
| 155 || September 21 || @Cubs || 9–8 || Gant (11–1) || Kimbrel (0–4) || Martínez (23) || 40,071 || 88–67 || W4
|- style="background:#cfc;"
| 156 || September 22 || @Cubs || 3–2 || Webb (2–1) || Darvish (6–8) || Miller (6) || 38,606 || 89–67 || W5
|- style="background:#cfc;"
| 157 || September 23 || @Diamondbacks || 9–7 || Wainwright (14–9) || Young (7–5) || Martínez (24) || 24,826 || 90–67 || W6
|- style="background:#fbb;"
| 158 || September 24 || @Diamondbacks || 2–3 (19) || Ginkel (3–0) || Brebbia (3–4) || — || 26,097 || 90–68 || L1
|- style="background:#fbb;"
| 159 || September 25 || @Diamondbacks || 7–9 || Kelly (13–14) || Fernández (0–1) || Bradley (17) || 21,420 || 90–69 || L2
|- style="background:#fbb;"
| 160 || September 27 || Cubs || 2–8 || Wieck (2–2) || Miller (5–6) || — || 46,530 || 90–70 || L3
|- style="background:#fbb;"
| 161 || September 28 || Cubs || 6–8 || Cishek (4–6) || Wainwright (14–10) || Kintzler (1) || 46,971 || 90–71 || L4
|- style="background:#cfc;"
| 162 || September 29 || Cubs || 9–0 || Flaherty (11–8) || Holland (2–5) || — || 47,200 || 91–71 || W1
|-

|-
| Legend:       = Win       = Loss       = PostponementBold = Cardinals team member

Postseason 

|- style="background:#bfb;"
| 1 || October 3 || @ Braves || 7–6 || Martínez (1–0) || Melancon (0–1) || — || 42,631 || 1–0 
|- style="background:#fbb;"
| 2 || October 4 || @ Braves || 0–3 || Foltynewicz (1–0) || Flaherty (0–1) || Melancon (1) || 42,911 || 1–1 
|- style="background:#fbb;"
| 3 || October 6 || Braves || 1–3 || Newcomb (1–0) || Martínez (1–1) || Melancon (2) || 46,701 || 1–2 
|- style="background:#bfb;"
| 4 || October 7 || Braves || 5–4  || Mikolas (1–0) || Teherán (0–1) || — || 42,203 || 2–2
|- style="background:#bfb;"
| 5 || October 9 || @ Braves || 13–1 || Flaherty (1–1) || Foltynewicz (1–1) || — || 43,122 || 3–2
|-

|- style="background:#fbb;"
| 1 || October 11 || Nationals || 0–2 || Sánchez (1–0) || Mikolas (0–1) || Doolittle (1) || 45,075 || 0–1
|- style="background:#fbb;"
| 2 || October 12 || Nationals || 1–3 || Scherzer (1–0) || Wainwright (0–1) || Hudson (1) || 46,458 || 0–2
|- style="background:#fbb;"
| 3 || October 14 || @ Nationals || 1–8 || Strasburg (1–0) || Flaherty (0–1) || — || 43,675 || 0–3
|- style="background:#fbb;"
| 4 || October 15 || @ Nationals || 4–7 || Corbin (1–0) || Hudson (0–1) || Hudson (2) || 43,976 || 0–4
|-

|-
| Legend:       = Win       = Loss       = PostponementBold = Cardinals team member

Postseason rosters

| style="text-align:left" |
Pitchers: 18 Carlos Martínez 21 Andrew Miller 22 Jack Flaherty 30 Tyler Webb 39 Miles Mikolas 43 Dakota Hudson 50 Adam Wainwright 56 Ryan Helsley 60 John Brebbia 61 Génesis Cabrera 62 Daniel Ponce de Leon 65 Giovanny Gallegos 
Catchers: 4 Yadier Molina 32 Matt Wieters 
Infielders: 12 Paul DeJong 13 Matt Carpenter 16 Kolten Wong 19 Tommy Edman 34 Yairo Muñoz 46 Paul Goldschmidt 
Outfielders: 23 Marcell Ozuna 25 Dexter Fowler 38 José Martínez 48 Harrison Bader 66 Randy Arozarena 
|- valign="top"

| style="text-align:left" |
Pitchers: 18 Carlos Martínez 21 Andrew Miller 22 Jack Flaherty 30 Tyler Webb 39 Miles Mikolas 43 Dakota Hudson 50 Adam Wainwright 56 Ryan Helsley 60 John Brebbia 61 Génesis Cabrera 62 Daniel Ponce de Leon 65 Giovanny Gallegos
Catchers: 4 Yadier Molina 32 Matt Wieters
Infielders: 12 Paul DeJong 13 Matt Carpenter 16 Kolten Wong 19 Tommy Edman 34 Yairo Muñoz 46 Paul Goldschmidt
Outfielders: 23 Marcell Ozuna 25 Dexter Fowler 38 José Martínez 48 Harrison Bader 66 Randy Arozarena
|- valign="top"

Opening Day lineup

Roster

Minor league system and first-year player draft

Teams

Major League Baseball draft

The 2019 Major League Baseball (MLB) First-Year Player Draft began on Monday, June 3, 2019, and ended June 5. The draft will assign amateur baseball players to MLB teams.

2019 Draft Order

2019 Draft Tracker (StL Cardinals)

References

External links
St. Louis Cardinals 2019 schedule at MLB.com
2019 St. Louis Cardinals at ESPN
2019 St. Louis Cardinals season at Baseball Reference

St. Louis Cardinals seasons
St. Louis Cardinals
St. Louis Cardinals
National League Central champion seasons